In the 18th century, the Qing dynasty conquered Dzungaria and the Tarim Basin, uniting them as Xinjiang. Qing-rule negatively affected the position of women in society.

Intermarriage between Han and Turks
There were eras in Xinjiang's history where intermarriage was common. "Laxity" led Uyghur women to marry Chinese men and not wear veils after Yaqub Beg's rule ended. Uyghurs also believe that they have Han Chinese ancestry from historical intermarriage (see around 10th century), such as those living in Turpan. From 1911-1949 when the Kuomintang ruled, many Uyghur girls approached Han soldiers for relationships.

Although banned in Islam, a form of temporary marriage from which the man could easily terminate and ignore the traditional contract was created. It was called "marriage of convenience" by Turkic Muslims in Xinjiang. However such marriages were repeatedly conducted by an Emam between Ughlug Beg's great granddaughter Nura Han and Ahmad Kamal.

Benefits 

The Uyghur women also were not subjected to any legal binding to their Chinese husbands so they could make their Chinese husbands provide them as much money as she wanted for her relatives and herself since otherwise the women could just leave. Moreover, the property of Chinese men was left to their Uyghur wives after they died. Uyghur women who intermarried considered Uyghur men to be inferior husbands to Chinese and other foreigners. Because they were viewed as "impure" Islamic cemeteries banned the Uyghur wives of Chinese men from being buried within them. The Uyghur women got around this problem by donating to shrines and buying graves in other towns. Besides Chinese men, others in Xinjiang such as Afghans, Hindus, Armenians, Jews, Russians, and Badakhshanis intermarried with local Uyghur women.

Le Coq reported that in his time, Uyghurs sometimes distrusted Tungans (Hui Muslims) more than Han Chinese, so that a Tungan would never be given a Uyghur woman in marriage by her father, while a (Han) Chinese men could be given a Uyghur woman in marriage by her father. In Kashgar 1933 the Chinese kept concubines and spouses who were Turkic women.

Qing "temporary marriages" 

Xinjiang temporary marriage, marriage de convenance, was called "waqitliq toy" in Uyghur. It was one of the prevalent forms of polygamy, "the mulla who performs the ceremony arranging for the divorce at the same time." The women and men married for a fixed period of time, several days to a week. While temporary marriage was banned in Russian Turkestan, Chinese-ruled Xinjiang permitted the temporary marriage where it was widespread.

As a result, Chinese merchants and soldiers, and some foreigners like Russians, foreign Muslims, and other Uyghur merchants all engaged in temporary marriages with Uyghur women. Since a lot of foreigners lived in Yarkand, temporary marriage flourished there more than it did in areas towards Kucha's east.

The basic formalities of normal marriages were maintained as a facade even in temporary marriages. Prostitution by Uyghur women due to the buying of daughters from impoverished families and divorced women was recorded by Scotsman George Hunter. Mullahs officiated temporary marriages; and both the divorce and the marriage proceedings were undertaken in the same ceremony if the marriage was only to last for a certain arranged time. There was also a temporary marriage bazaar in Yangi Hissar according to Nazaroff. Temporary marriages especially violated Sunni Islam Sharia.

Mixed offspring 

The local society accepted the Uyghur women and Chinese men's mixed offspring as their own people despite the marriages violating Sharia. Uyghur women also conducted "temporary marriages" with Chinese men such as nearby Chinese soldiers temporarily stationed for tours of duty. After these marriages the Chinese men returned to their own cities and "sold" their mixed daughters and Uyghur wives to his comrades. They took their sons with them if they could afford it but otherwise left them behind.

Valikhanov claimed that the mixed children of Turkistan were referred to as çalğurt. Uyghur women were criticized for having "negative character" by a Kashgari Uyghur woman's Tibetan husband. Racist views of each other's ethnicities between partners in interethnic marriages still persisted at times. During this era it was mostly Uyghur women marrying foreign men with a few cases of the opposite occurring.

Turkic Muslims in different areas of Xinjiang held derogatory views of each other such as claiming that Chinese men were welcomed by the loose Yamçi girls.

Andijani (Kokandi) Turkic Muslim merchants (from modern Uzbekistan), who shared the same religion, similar culture, cuisine, clothing, and phenotypes with the Altishahri Uyghurs, also frequently married local Altishahri women. The name "chalgurt" was also applied to their mixed race daughters and sons. The daughters were left behind with their Uyghur Altishahri mothers while the sons were taken by the Kokandi fathers when they returned to their homeland.

The Qing then banned Khoqandi merchants from marrying Kashgari women. Due to 'group jealously'; religious, ethnic differences; and sex; disputes broke out due to Chinese and Uighur. The Uighur locals also viewed fellow Turkic Muslim Andijanis as competitors for "their own women." A Uyghur proverb said "Do not let a man from Andijan into your house."

Written accounts 
Childless, married youthful women were called "chaucan" by Uyghurs: "there was the chaucan always ready to contract an alliance for a long or short period with the merchant or traveller visiting the country or with anybody else".

Henry Lansdell wrote in 1893 in his book Chinese Central Asia an account of temporary marriage practiced by a Uyghur Muslim woman, who married three different Chinese officers and a Muslim official. The station of prostitutes was accorded by society to these Muslim women who had sex with Chinese men.

Intermarriage and patronage of prostitutes were among the forms of interaction between the Uyghur in Xinjiang and visiting Chinese merchants. Many of the young Kashgari women were most attractive in appearance, and some of the little girls quite lovely, their plaits of long hair falling from under a jaunty little embroidered cap, their big dark eyes, flashing teeth and piquant olive faces reminding me of Italian or Spanish children... The women wear their hair in two or five plaits much thickened and lengthened by the addition of yak's hair, but the children in several tiny plaits. The peasants are fairly well off, as the soil is rich, the abundant water-supply free, and the taxation comparatively light. It was always interesting to meet them taking their live stock into market. Flocks of sheep with tiny lambs, black and white, pattered along the dusty road; here a goat followed its master like a dog, trotting behind the diminutive ass which the farmer bestrode; or boys, clad in the whity-brown native cloth, shouted incessantly at donkeys almost invisible under enormous loads of forage, or carried fowls and ducks in bunches head downwards, a sight that always made me long to come to the rescue of the luckless birds.Certainly the mullas do their best to keep the fair sex in their place, and are in the habit of beating those who show their faces in the Great Bazar. But I was told that poetic justice had lately been meted out to one of these upholders of the law of Islam, for by mistake he chastised a Kashgari woman married to a Chinaman, whereupon the irate husband set upon him with a big stick and castigated him soundly.

Almost every Chinaman in Yarkand, soldier or civilian, takes unto himself a temporary wife, dispensing entirely with the services of the clergy, as being superfluous, and most of the high officials also give way to the same amiable weakness, their mistresses being in almost all cases natives of Khotan, which city enjoys the unenviable distinction of supplying every large city in Turkestan with courtesans.When a Chinaman is called back to his own home in China proper, or a Chinese soldier has served his time in Turkestan and has to return to his native city of Pekin or Shanghai, he either leaves his temporary wife behind to shift for herself, or he sells her to a friend. If he has a family he takes the boys with him—if he can afford it—failing that, the sons are left alone and unprotected to fight the battle of life, while in the case of daughters, he sells them to one of his former companions for a trifling sum.The natives, although all Mahammadans, have a strong predilection for the Chinese, and seem to like their manners and customs, and never seem to resent this behaviour to their womankind, their own manners, customs, and morals [?] being of the very loosest description.

That a Muslim should take in marriage one of alien faith is not objected to; it is rather deemed a meritorious act thus to bring an unbeliever to the true religion. The Muslim woman, on the other hand, must not be given in marriage to a non-Muslim; such a union is regarded as the most heinous of sins. In this matter, however, compromises are sometimes made with heaven: the marriage of a Uyghur princess with the emperor Ch'ien-lung has already been referred to; and, when the present writer passed through Minjol (a day's journey west of Kashgar) in 1902, a Chinese with a Uyghur wife [concubine?] was presented to him. He procured me a Chinese interpreter, Fong Shi, a pleasant and agreeable young Chinaman, who wrote his mother-tongue with ease and spoke Jagatai Uyghur fluently, and—did not smoke opium. He left his wife and child behind him in Khotan, Liu Darin making himself answerable for their maintenance. But I also paid Fong Shi three months' salary in advance, and that money he gave to his wife. Whenever I could find leisure he was to give me lessons in Chinese, and we began at once, even before we left Khotan. Thus the young Chinaman's proud dream of one day riding through the gates of Peking and beholding the palace (yamen) of his fabulously mighty emperor, as well as of perhaps securing, through my recommendation, a lucrative post, and finally, though by no means last in his estimation, of exchanging the Uyghur wife he had left behind in Khotan for a Chinese bride—this proud dream was pricked at the foot of Arka-tagh. Sadly and silently he stood alone in the desert, gazing after us, as we continued our way towards the far-distant goal of his youthful ambition.

Xiang Army and other Han Chinese male soldiers and sojourners bought Turki Musulman (Uyghur) girls as wives from their parents after Zuo Zongtang's reconquest of Xinjiang, and the Han and Uyghurs often relied on Hui intermediaries to translate and broker the marriages. A Han Chinese man with the surname Li bought a young Uyghur men from two Uyghur men who kidnapped her in 1880. They were employed by the magistrate of Pichan. A Turpan Uyghur girl named Ruo-zang-le who was 12 was sold for 30 taels in 1889 in Qitai to a young Han Chinese Shanxi man named Liu Yun. She became pregnant with his child in 1892. Han Chinese men viewed the toyluq they paid in silver for their Uyghur brides as a bride price. Uyghur Muslim women married Han Chinese men in Xinjiang in the late 19th and early 20th centuries.  Han Chinese men, Hindu men, Armenian men, Jewish men and Russian men were married by Uyghur Muslim women who could not find husbands. Uyghur merchants would harass Hindu usurers by screaming at them asking them if they ate beef or hanging cow skins on their quarters. Uyghur men also rioted and attacked Hindus for marrying Uyghur women in 1907 in Poskam and Yarkand like Ditta Ram calling for their beheading and stoning as they engaged in anti-Hindu violence.  Hindu Indian usurers engaging in a religious procession led to violence against them by Muslim Uyghurs. In 1896 two Uyghur Turkis attacked a Hindu merchant and the British consul Macartney demanded the Uyghurs be punished by flogging.

Women in Uyghur society 
The lack of Han Chinese women in Xinjiang led to Uyghur Muslim women marrying Han Chinese men. Moreover, Unmarried Muslim Uyghur women married non-Muslims like Chinese if they could not find a Muslim husband. These women sometimes faced hostility from their families. In 1917 the Swedish Christian missionary J. E. Lundahl said that the local Muslim women in Xinjiang married Chinese men because of a lack of Chinese women, and that the relatives of the woman and other Muslims reviled the women for their marriages.

Societal expectations 
Among Uyghurs it was thought that God designed women to endure hardship and work, the word for "helpless one", ʿājiza, was used to call women who were not married while women who were married were called mazlūm among Turkic Muslims in Xinjiang. However, the actual position of Uyghur women in society varied considerably and was determined by economic and political factors. Divorce and remarriage was facile for the women.

Marriage 
Women of Khotan, Yarkand, and Kashgar usually married at ages 14 – 15; sometimes it was even 12 years for girls and 13 for boys. Cousin marriages were practiced by the wealthy. There was no marriage between adherents of the Artish located pro-China Black Mountain and the Kucha located anti-China White Mountain sects. Marriages were arranged and arbitrated with financial and religious obligations from both parties. Less complicated arrangements were made for widows and divorcees who wanted to marry again. Wives were often judged according to how many children they could bear. Ceremonies were held after the birth of a child. Public shaming was arranged for adulterers. Women called to Allah to grant them marriage by the shrines of saints.

Child marriages for girls was very common and the Uyghurs called girls "overripe" if they were not married by 16 or 18 years old. Marriages were arranged, and husbands were sought out for suitable matches by parents. The high number of "child marriages" at an extreme young age led to high divorce rates.

Veils

Traveller Ahmad Kamal writes an account in Land without Laughter , which describes his trip to Xinjiang during the Kumul Rebellion. In the streets of the bazar of Ürümqi Uyghur women did not veil unlike southern Xinjiang's Muslim bazars where women veiled in public. Nomadic women did not wear the face veil and neither did peasant women. Only urban rich did. Kamal saw an unveiled peasant woman Jennett Han. The face veil was only allowed to be taken off in the house and were worn just for their husbands and fellow women to see. When Kamal and his companions spied on a boudoir in a Uyghur garden, the young women dropped their veils whereas the "older hags" were angry (at the peeping Toms).

Face covering veils with caps of otter were worn in the streets by women in public in Xinjiang. In order to properly mount her stirrup with her foot, one Uyghur woman had to temporarily lift her veil to see better. Ahmad Kamal's girlfriend Nura Han covered her face with the veil but then removed it after marrying him.

One saying was that: "Muslim maidens wear the red that bespeaks a virgin, and the transparency of their veils reveals a desire to change their raiment's hue."

Prostitution 
Uyghur prostitutes were encountered by Carl Gustaf Emil Mannerheim who wrote they were especially to be found in Khotan. He commented on "venereal diseases".

Different ethnic groups had different attitudes toward prostitution. George W. Hunter (missionary) noted that while Tungan Muslims would almost never prostitute their daughters, Uyghur Muslims would, which was why Uyghur prostitutes were common around the country.

References

Uyghur people
Uyghurs